"A Dream" is a song by DeBarge. Written by Bunny DeBarge and produced by El DeBarge, the song is from their hit album In a Special Way. Although the track was not released as a single, the song has been popular over the years on R&B radio and has been sampled by several artists in the hip-hop and urban contemporary genres.

Background
"A Dream" was one of the few songs in which DeBarge member, sister Bunny DeBarge, played a role as both its songwriter and its lead vocalist while her four brothers (Mark, Randy, El and James DeBarge) sang in the background. The song talked of a woman's dose of reality when she realizes the happiness she thought she felt with a suitor wasn't real, recalling how at one point she and her lover "danced to a melody" of a song, then when "the music stops", she realizes the dream is "haunting (her) again".

Samples, covers and other use
• In the following years, the song would be used as a sample for some R&B and hip-hop songs, mainly used in the basis of hit singles for Blackstreet (their 1997 hit, "Don't Leave Me"), 2Pac (his 1996 single, "I Ain't Mad At Cha"), Children of the Corn ("American Dream"), and Fifth Harmony ("We Know" song off their 2015 album, Reflection).• In 1997, R&B singer Mary J. Blige covered the song for the soundtrack to the Chris Tucker film, Money Talks.• In 1997, during a scene in the film Soul Food, Miles (portrayed by Michael Beach) played a variation of the song's instrumental intro as rehearsal for his wife's cousin Faith (Gina Ravera) for a dance audition.• In 2003 Keshia Chanté used a sample of it in a song titled "Unpredictable".  • In 2005 it was sampled on Rihanna's debut album with the track "There's a Thug in my Life" 
•It was used in 2008 by Lady Gaga on the song "Paper Gangsta." • Z-Ro used the sample for his song “I Don’t Give a Damn” from his 2009 album, Cocaine• Victoria Beckham sampled "A Dream" in an unreleased song she recorded titled "Right Back To You"

•South African artist A-Reece sampled “A Dream” in his song titled “Mgani”• Sampled in "Whatever You Need" by Meek Mill in 2017.
• Sampled in Lie To Me by Queen Naija and Lil Durk in 2020.

Personnel
Lead vocals by Bunny DeBarge
Background vocals by Bunny DeBarge, Randy DeBarge and El DeBarge
Written by Bunny DeBarge
Produced by El DeBarge

External links
DeBarge Album-In a Special Way. allmusic.com

1983 songs
1997 singles
DeBarge songs
Mary J. Blige songs
Gordy Records singles
Songs about dreams